Ken Chestek is an American politician and a Democratic member of the Wyoming House of Representatives representing the 13th district since January 10, 2023.

Political career

Chestek first ran for the Wyoming House of Representatives in 2016 when incumbent Republican representative Glenn Moniz of the 46th district retired to run for the state senate. He won the Democratic primary unopposed, but was defeated in the general election by Bill Haley, receiving 42% of the vote.

When incumbent Democrat and House Minority Leader Cathy Connolly declined to run for reelection, Chestek announced his candidacy and won the Democratic primary on August 16, 2022, unopposed. He then won the general election on November 8, 2022, defeating Republican nominee Wayne Pinch with 60% of the vote.

References

External links
Profile from Ballotpedia

Living people
Democratic Party members of the Wyoming House of Representatives
People from Laramie, Wyoming
Pennsylvania State University alumni
University of Pittsburgh alumni
21st-century American politicians
Year of birth missing (living people)